The Nuneaton and Bedworth Borough Council election to the Nuneaton and Bedworth Borough Council took place on 3 May 2012. Half of the council was up for election. Labour gained control of the council.

Council Composition

The composition of the council before the election and a summary of which parties' seats are up for election can be found in the following table:

Election results

Ward results

References

2012
2012 English local elections
2010s in Warwickshire